Fourman may refer to:

Fourman Hill
Michael Fourman